Shentu is an uncommon Chinese surname.

See also
Chinese family name
Shentu (深土), a town in Fujian unrelated to the name

Chinese-language surnames
Individual Chinese surnames